Craphonso Ja'won "Cro" Thorpe (born June 27, 1983) is a former American football wide receiver. He was drafted by the Kansas City Chiefs in the fourth round of the 2005 NFL Draft. He played college football at Florida State.

Thorpe has also been a member of the Houston Texans, Detroit Lions, Indianapolis Colts, Jacksonville Jaguars, New York Giants, Tennessee Titans, Winnipeg Blue Bombers, New York Sentinels, and Omaha Nighthawks.

Early years
Craphonso's first name is derived from his father's two given names, Craig and Alphonso, and is pronounced roughly "Crah-fonzo".

He attended Lincoln High School in Tallahassee, Florida. His senior year saw him catch 64 passes for 1,024 yards and eight touchdowns. He also played cornerback, and was regarded as a top prospect in Florida at both positions. Thorpe recorded 24 tackles, three interceptions, 14 pass break-ups and recovered two fumbles at the cornerback position. Lincoln High School won the Florida State Title Championship in his junior year there.

In track, he was a fast 100m runner, placing 2nd in the Florida 4A Track Meet behind Wharton High Schools Dwight Ellick in his senior year. His time in the finals was 10.68, Ellick ran a 10.6 flat.

He played in the first-ever U.S. Army All-American Bowl on December 30, 2000.

Professional career

Kansas City Chiefs
Thorpe was drafted by the Kansas City Chiefs in the fourth round (116th overall) of the 2005 NFL Draft. He signed a three-year contract with the team on July 29, 2005. He was released by the team during final cuts on September 3, 2005.

Following his release, Thorpe was added to the Chiefs' practice squad. He remained there until December 30, 2005 when he was signed to the active roster. However, he was inactive for the team's final game of the season.

Thorpe battled a shoulder injury during the 2006 preseason and was waived by the team on August 28, 2006.

Houston Texans
On October 17, 2006, the Houston Texans signed Thorpe to their practice squad. He was released by the team on October 25.

Detroit Lions
Thorpe remained unsigned until January 2, 2007, when he signed with the Detroit Lions. He failed to make it to training camp with the team, however, and was waived on April 18.

Indianapolis Colts
Thorpe was then claimed off waivers by the Indianapolis Colts. He was waived by the team on September 1, 2007 but re-signed to the practice squad on September 20, 2007.

On October 7, 2007, Thorpe was signed to the active roster after Rob Morris was placed on injured reserve. He made his NFL debut that day against the Tampa Bay Buccaneers, returning three kickoffs for 19 yards and four punts for nine yards.

Thorpe recorded his first offensive statistics against the San Diego Chargers on November 11, 2007 catching five passes for 41 yards in what would also be his most productive game of the season. He caught another pass for six yards the following week against the Kansas City Chiefs.

In the team's regular season finale against the Tennessee Titans, Thorpe caught his first career touchdown on a three-yard pass from backup quarterback Jim Sorgi.

Two weeks later, Thorpe was inactive for the team's divisional round playoff game against the Chargers, which the Colts lost 28–24. He was waived by the team the following offseason on February 29, 2008.

Jacksonville Jaguars
On May 31, 2008, Thorpe was signed by the Jacksonville Jaguars to a one-year, $370,000 contract. However, he was waived on June 16.

New York Giants
On June 20, 2008, Thorpe signed with the New York Giants. He was released with an injury settlement on August 28.

Tennessee Titans
After spending the 2008 season out of football, Thorpe was signed by the Tennessee Titans on January 6, 2009. He was waived on July 7, 2009.

Winnipeg Blue Bombers
Thorpe signed a practice roster agreement by the Winnipeg Blue Bombers on July 13, 2009. He was released on September 2.

New York Sentinels
Thorpe was signed by the New York Sentinels of the United Football League on September 9, 2009.

References

External links
Just Sports Stats
Florida State Seminoles bio
Indianapolis Colts bio
Jacksonville Jaguars bio
Winnipeg Blue Bombers bio

1983 births
Living people
Players of American football from Tallahassee, Florida
American football wide receivers
Canadian football wide receivers
American players of Canadian football
Florida State Seminoles football players
Kansas City Chiefs players
Houston Texans players
Detroit Lions players
Indianapolis Colts players
Jacksonville Jaguars players
New York Giants players
Tennessee Titans players
Winnipeg Blue Bombers players
New York Sentinels players
Omaha Nighthawks players